Effect of Snow on Petit-Montrouge (French: Effet de neige à Petit-Montrouge) is an 1870 landscape painting by the French painter Édouard Manet.

History

The oil on canvas painting shows a winter view of Petit-Montrouge, an area in the 14th arrondissement of Paris. Manet painted this picture while a member of the National Guard during the 1870–71 Siege of Paris of the Franco-Prussian War. As opposed to the history painters of his time, Manet does not show a heroic view of battle, but rather the dusky ambiance of a looming battle. The image reflects Manet's loss of hope about the military situation, his profound loneliness, and the deprivation he suffered during this time. It is one of the few landscapes in Manet's oeuvre, and is one of Manet's first plein air paintings. Today it is in the collection of the National Museum Cardiff.

The crossing tower of the church rises to the right of the bell tower. The black contours of the roof of the crossing tower are clearly contrasted with the gray of the building, while the bell tower lacks such borders and thin brushstrokes indicate the windows in the characteristic spire. The snow-covered roof of the nave can be seen between the two towers, cut through by a chimney in front of it. Further chimneys can be found to limit the horizon line on the right edge of the picture and to the right of the residential building on the left edge of the picture, the identity of which can no longer be determined today. Only the upper floor and the roof of the building cut off by the edge of the picture are executed. The windows are indicated by three black dabs of color in the grey-ochre façade. On the upper area of ​​the black roof, the snow lying on it is sketched in high-contrast white paint. Between this house and the church and directly in front of the church there are other dark roofs covered with snow, without these buildings being able to be identified.

Composition

Manet uses earthly and muted tones to illustrate an urban snow landscape; between the large peaks of white and diagonals of murky brown the Paris district of Petit-Montrouge is illustrate, overshadowed by the brown dirty snow and bleak beige sky. The buildings in the background were painted with muted colours to give an appearance of balancing precariously on a huge expanse of brown.

Provenance 
Effet de neige à Petit-Montrouge is not mentioned in Manet's sales documents. He may have given the painting to H. Charlet, mentioned in the dedication of the painting, shortly after it was completed. However, the Rouart/Wildenstein authors assume that Manet gave the painting to the journalist Pierre Giffard (1853–1922), who sold the painting to the Durand-Ruel art dealership in 1905. This led Effet de neige à Petit-Montrouge until October 1912, when it was acquired by the Welsh art collector Gwendoline Davies. After her death, the painting was donated to what is now the National Museum Cardiff, along with her important art collection.

References

 Richard R. Brettell: Impression : Painting quickly in France 1860–1890. Exhibit catalog, London, Amsterdam, Williamstown, Yale University Press, New Haven und London 2000, .
 Edward Lilley: Manet's "modernity" and "Effet de neige à Petit-Montrouge"  in Gazette des Beaux-Arts, September 1991
 Michael Wilson: Manet at Work. Exhibit catalog, National Gallery, London 1983, .
 Aindrea Emelife, Ten Great Works Of Art Depicting Snow, December 2015, BBC, London. Accessed at http://www.bbc.com/culture/story/20151218-ten-great-works-of-art-depicting-snow

Paintings by Édouard Manet
Paintings in the collection of National Museum Cardiff
1870 paintings
Landscape paintings
War paintings